Lieutenant-Colonel James Burton ( James Haliburton; 29 July 1761 – 31 March 1837) was the most successful property developer of Regency and of Georgian London, in which he built over 3000 properties in 250 acres.  The Oxford Dictionary of National Biography contends that Burton was 'the most successful developer in late Georgian London, responsible for some of its most characteristic architecture'.

James built most of Bloomsbury (including Bedford Square, Russell Square, Bloomsbury Square, Tavistock Square, and Cartwright Gardens), and St John's Wood, Regent Street, Regent Street St. James, Waterloo Place, St. James's, Swallow Street, Regent's Park (including its Inner Circle villas in addition to Chester Terrace, Cornwall Terrace, Clarence Terrace, and York Terrace). James also financed and built the projects of John Nash at Regent's Park (most of which were designed by James's son Decimus Burton, rather than by Nash) to the extent that the Commissioners of Woods described James, not Nash, as 'the architect of Regent's Park'. James also developed the town of St Leonards-on-Sea, which is now part of Hastings.

James Burton was a member of London high society during the Georgian era and during the Regency era. He was an early member of the Athenaeum Club, London, whose Clubhouse his company built to a design by his son Decimus Burton, who was the Club's 'prime member'. James was a friend of Princess Victoria (the future Queen Victoria), and of the Duchess of Kent. He was Master of the Worshipful Company of Tylers and Bricklayers, and Sheriff of Kent. James's children included the Egyptologist James Burton; the physician Henry Burton; and the architect Decimus Burton. He was the grandfather of Constance Mary Fearon, who was the founder of the Francis Bacon Society.

The Burtons' London mansion, The Holme of Regent's Park (which was built by James's company to a design by Decimus Burton) was described by 20th century architectural critic Ian Nairn as 'a definition of Western civilization in a single view'. Burton also built the Burtons' Tonbridge mansion Mabledon.

Family
James Burton was born in Strand, London, as James Haliburton, on 29 July 1761. He was the son of William Haliburton (1731–1785), who was a Scottish property-developer whose family were from Roxburghshire, and of Mary Foster (who was previously Mary Johnson; 1735–1785), whom his father married in 1760. Mary Foster was the daughter of Nicholas Foster of Kirkby Fleetham, Yorkshire.<ref name=ODNB>{{cite web|url=http://oxfordindex.oup.com/view/10.1093/ref:odnb/50182?rskey=dTXFr9&result=1|title=James Burton [Haliburton]", Oxford Dictionary of National Biography|access-date=20 June 2016|archive-date=29 March 2019|archive-url=https://web.archive.org/web/20190329120443/http://oxfordindex.oup.com/view/10.1093/ref:odnb/50182?rskey=dTXFr9&result=1|url-status=dead}}</ref> 

William Haliburton and Mary Foster had two sons, James and another who died in infancy. Burton's paternal great-grandparents were Rev. James Haliburton (1681 – 1756) and Margaret Eliott (who was the daughter of Sir William Eliott, 2nd Baronet and the aunt of George Augustus Eliott, 1st Baron Heathfield). 

James Burton's father William was descended from John Haliburton (1573 – 1627) from whom Sir Walter Scott, 1st Baronet was descended on the maternal side. Burton was a cousin of the Canadian author and British Tory MP Thomas Chandler Haliburton, and of Lord Haliburton, who was the first Canadian to be raised to the Peerage of the United Kingdom. 

James (b. 1761) was christened with the name 'James Haliburton' at Presbyterian Chapel, Soho, London. He shortened his surname to Burton in 1794, and between the birth of his fourth child and the birth of his fifth child.

Education
James was educated at a day school in Covent Garden before he was privately tutored, including in architecture. In July 1776 he was articled to a surveyor named James Dalton, with whom he remained for six years, until 1782, when he commenced with speculative construction projects, in some of which Dalton was his partner.

 Significant property developments 
Bloomsbury: including Foundling Hospital Estate, which included Brunswick Square, Guilford Street, and Mecklenburgh Square(on which he built 600 houses); Bedford Square; Bloomsbury Square (where the remaining north side are Burton's original houses); Russell Square; Bedford Place; Montague Street; Tavistock Square; Tavistock House (for himself); and Cartwright Gardens (which were originally named Burton Street and Burton Crescent). 
St John's Wood
Regent Street: Burton built 191 of the houses of Regent Street, and their joining archways. Five of the largest blocks of Regent Street were purchased by Burton in 1817. Burton's houses on Regent Street are No. 4 to No. 12; No. 17 to No. 25; No. 106 to No. 128; No. 132 to No. 154; No. 133 to No. 167; No. 171 to No. 195; and No. 295 to No. 319. These were built, together with Carlton Chambers, between 1817 and 1820. He also built between Leicester Street and No. 129 Swallow Street in 1820. He built the east side of Regent Street in 1821, and the west side of Regent Street, specifically the part between the Quadrant and Oxford Street, and its archways, in 1822. He built north of Old Burlington Street, and the east side of the street between Chapel Court and the entrance to the King Street Chapel SW1, in 1822.
Regent Street St. James (Lower Regent Street).
Waterloo Place, St. James's, whose facades Burton modelled on those of the Place Vendome in Paris, between 1815 and 1816.
Regent's Park, including the Inner Circle villas; Cornwall Terrace (1821); York Terrace; Clarence Terrace (1823); and Chester Terrace (1825).
The Holme, Inner Circle, Regent's Park, (1818) The mansion of the Burton family, designed by his son Decimus Burton and built by James Burton's company. It has been described as 'one of the most desirable private homes in London' by architectural scholar Guy Williams, and the architectural critic Ian Nairn described it as 'a definition of western civilization in a single view'.
St Leonards-on-Sea (1827 - 1837). 

The architectural scholar Guy Williams contends, "He [Burton] was no ordinary builder. He could have put up an imposing and beautifully proportioned building, correct in every constructional detail, from the roughest of sketches tossed patronizingly at him by a "gentleman architect"". James's industry quickly made him 'most gratifyingly rich'. Burton worked as an 'Architect and Builder' in Southwark between 1785 and 1792. 

By 1787, Burton had established a positive reputation in Southwark: in 1786 he had built the Blackfriars Rotunda in Great Surrey Street (now Blackfriars Road) to house the Leverian Museum, for land agent and museum proprietor James Parkinson; this building subsequently housed the Southwark Institution.

Burton when aged 28 years first proposed to build on the land that was made available by the Foundling Hospital, on which he worked from 1789. He built the earliest part of the Royal Veterinary College in Camden Town in 1792 - 1793.

Between 1790 and 1792, he asked the Governors of the Foundling Hospital for a permission to exclusively build on the whole of Brunswick Square, but they underestimated his ability, and declined to waive their rule of not allowing any one speculator to develop more than a small proportion of the ground, and granted Burton only a small part of land on the south side and part of Guildford Street. Subsequently, however, Burton expanded this estate with further purchases until he became the most important builder on the hospital's estate, and owned most of its western property: between 1792 and 1802 he built 586 houses on the estate, on which he spent over £400,000, to bring the total number of his constructions on the estate to 600. Samuel Pepys Cockerell, advisor to the Governors of the Foundling Hospital, commended Burton's excellence:"Without such a man [James Burton], possessed of very considerable talents, unwearied industry, and a capital of his own, the extraordinary success of the improvement of the Foundling Estate could not have taken place... By his own peculiar resources of mind, he has succeeded in disposing of his buildings and rents, under all disadvantages of war, and of an unjust clamour which has repeatedly been raised against him. Mr. Burton was ready to come forward with money and personal assistance to relieve and help forward those builders who were unable to proceed in their contracts; and in some instances he has been obliged to resume the undertaking and complete himself what has been weakly and imperfectly proceeded with...".

The contemporary Oxford Dictionary of National Biography contends that 'there is certainly no doubt about his energy and financial acumen'. Burton was vigorously industrious, and quickly became 'most gratifyingly rich'. Throughout his development of the Foundling Hospital Estate, Burton was encouraged by Francis Russell, 5th Duke of Bedford, and his successor, John Russell, 6th Duke of Bedford, and by the Skinners' Company to develop the remainder of Bloomsbury, including their adjacent estates. In 1800, Burton bought a portion of the London estate of the Dukes of Bedford, and immediately demolished the Bedfords decaying London mansion, Bedford House, on the site of which he constructed several family homes, including the houses of Bedford Place and Russell Square.

Style

In these Bloomsbury developments, Burton again demonstrated his architectural flair, as Williams describes: "James Burton became adept at relieving the monotony of long residential terraces by allowing their central blocks to project slightly from the surfaces to each side, and by bringing forward, too, the houses at each end". Williams also records that "the ironwork in a classical style in James Burton's Bloomsbury terraces was, and often still is, particularly fine, though mass produced". The Bloomsbury Conservation Areas Advisory Council describes Burton's Bloomsbury terraces, "His terraces are in his simple but eloquent Neoclassical style, with decorative doorcases, recessed sash windows in compliance with the latest fire regulations, and more stucco than before". Jane Austen described Burton's new area of London in Emma: "Our part of London is so very superior to most others! - You must not confound us with London in general, my dear sir. The neighbourhood of Brunswick Square is very different from all the rest". 

In 1970, John Lehmann predicted that Burton's Bloomsbury would soon disappear "except for a few isolated rows... to remind us of man-sized architecture in a vanished age of taste". Burton exhibited his design of the south side of Russell Square at the Royal Academy Exhibition of 1800. Burton's urban designs were characterized by spacious formal layouts of terraces, squares, and crescents.

In 1807 Burton expanded his Bloomsbury development north, and was also involved extensively in the early development of St John's Wood.Victoria County History: Middlesex and London. Celebrating the birth in July 1761 of James Burton, the founder of St Leonards-on-Sea and builder-developer in Bloomsbury. Accessed 18 June 2016. He then left London for a project in Tunbridge Wells but returned in 1807 to build over the Skinners Company ground between the Bedford Estate and the lands owned by the Foundling Hospital, where he built Burton Street and Burton Crescent (now Cartwright Gardens), including, for himself, the Tavistock House, on ground now occupied by the British Medical Association, where he lived until he moved to The Holme in Regent's Park, which was designed for him by his son Decimus Burton. Burton also developed the Lucas Estate.

Burton constructed some houses at Tunbridge Wells between 1805 and 1807. Burton developed Waterloo Place, St. James's, between 1815 and 1816. In 1815, James Burton took Decimus to Hastings, where the two would later design and build St Leonards-on-Sea, and, in 1816, Decimus commenced work in the James Burton's office. Whilst working for his father, Decimus was present in the design and construction of Regent Street St. James (Lower Regent Street). Simultaneously, George Maddox taught Decimus architectural draughtsmanship, including the details of the five orders. After his first year of tuition by his father and Maddox, Decimus submitted to the Royal Academy a design for a bridge, which was commended by the Academy.

Between 1785 and 1823, before many of his Regent's Park terraces were complete, James Burton had constructed at least 2366 houses in London.

Relationship with John Nash
The parents of John Nash (b. 1752), and Nash himself during his childhood, lived in Southwark, where Burton worked as an 'Architect and Builder' and developed a positive reputation for prescient speculative building between 1785 and 1792. Burton  built the Blackfriars Rotunda in Great Surrey Street (now Blackfriars Road) to house the Leverian Museum, for land agent and museum proprietor James Parkinson.

However, whereas Burton was vigorously industrious, and quickly became 'most gratifyingly rich', Nash's early years in private practice, and his first speculative developments, which failed either to sell or let, were unsuccessful, and Nash's consequent financial shortage was exacerbated by the 'crazily extravagant' wife, whom he had married before he had completed his training, until he was declared bankrupt in 1783. To resolve his financial shortage, Nash cultivated the acquaintance of Burton, and Burton consented to patronize him. 

James Burton was responsible for the social and financial patronage of the majority of Nash's London designs, in addition to for their construction. Architectural scholar Guy Williams has written, 'John Nash relied on James Burton for moral and financial support in his great enterprises. Decimus had showed precocious talent as a draughtsman and as an exponent of the classical style... John Nash needed the son's aid, as well as the father's'. Subsequent to the Crown Estate's refusal to finance them, James Burton agreed to personally finance the construction projects of John Nash at Regent's Park, which he had already been commissioned to construct: consequently, in 1816, Burton purchased many of the leases of the proposed terraces around, and proposed villas within, Regent's Park, and, in 1817, Burton purchased the leases of five of the largest blocks on Regent Street. The first property to be constructed by Burton in the vicinity of Regent's Park was his own mansion: The Holme, which was designed by his son, Decimus Burton, and completed in 1818. Burton's extensive financial involvement 'effectively guaranteed the success of the project'. In return, Nash agreed to promote the career of Decimus Burton. 

Such were James Burton's contributions to the project that the Commissioners of Woods described James, not Nash, as 'the architect of Regent's Park'. Contrary to popular belief, the dominant architectural influence in many of the Regent's Park projects (including Cornwall Terrace, York Terrace, Chester Terrace, Clarence Terrace, and the villas of the Inner Circle, all of which were constructed by James Burton's company) was Decimus Burton, not John Nash, who was appointed architectural 'overseer' for Decimus's projects. To the chagrin of Nash, Decimus largely disregarded his advice and developed the Terraces according to his own style, to the extent that Nash sought the demolition and complete rebuilding of Chester Terrace, but in vain. Decimus subsequently eclipsed Nash and emerged as the primary influence of the design of Carlton House Terrace, where he exclusively designed No. 3 and No. 4.

London Legacy
James Burton's imperative contribution to the development of the West End is acknowledged increasingly since the 20th century: including by Baines, John Summerson, Olsen, and Dana Arnold. Steen Eiler Rasmussen, in London: The Unique City, commended Burton's buildings, but did not identify their architect. The Oxford Dictionary of National Biography contends that Burton were 'the most successful developer in late Georgian London, responsible for some of its most characteristic architecture', and the Burtons' St. Leonards Society'' that he were "probably the most significant builder of Georgian London".

Gunpowder manufacturer
James Burton, from 1811, invested in the manufacture of gunpowder at Powder Mills, Leigh that was managed by Burton and his eldest son, William Ford, who directed sales of the product from his office in the City of London. The mills, which were initially known as the Ramhurst Powder Mills, and later as the Tunbridge Gunpowder Works, were that established in 1811 in partnership with Sir Humphry Davy, who later sold his shares to the Burtons, who thereby became the sole owners of the Works. 

After the retirement of James Burton in 1824, William Ford became the sole owner of the mills until his death in 1856, at which point the gunpowder business to his brother, Alfred Burton Mayor, of Hastings.

Development of St Leonards-on-Sea
In 1827, James Burton realised that the ancient Manor of Gensing, which was situated between Hastings and the Bulverhythe Marshes, could be developed. Decimus Burton advised against this prospective project of his father, which limited his supply of capital for his own development of the Calverley Estate, but James ignored him, bought it, and proceeded to build St Leonards-on-Sea as a pleasure resort for the gentry. James Burton designed the town 'on the twin principles of classical formality and picturesque irregularity', to rival Brighton. The majority of the first part of the town had been completed by 1830. In 1833, St. Leonards-on-Sea was described as 'a conceited Italian town'.

Family homes
During 1800, in which his tenth child Decimus was born, James was living at the 'very comfortable and well staffed' North House in the newly built Southampton Terrace at Bloomsbury. He subsequently lived at Tavistock House, which later became the residence of Charles Dickens. Subsequent to the birth of his twelfth child, Jessy, in 1804, Burton purchased a site on a hill about one mile to the south of Tonbridge in Kent, where he constructed, to the designs of the architect Joseph T. Parkinson, in 1805, a large country mansion which he named Mabledon House, which was described in 1810 by the local authority as 'an elegant imitation of an ancient castellated mansion'. The majority of the stone that Burton required for Mabledon was quarried from the hill on which Mabledon was to be built, but Burton also purchased stone from the recent demolition of the nearby mansion Penhurst Place. Burton at Mabledon employed a bailiff and a gamekeeper, hosted balls, and was shortly invested as Sheriff of Kent for 1810. A diary written by James Burton, which records his activities between 1783 and 1811, is at Hastings Museum and Art Gallery. The Burtons lived at Mabledon from 1805 to 1817.

Subsequently, from 1818, Burton resided at The Holme, Regent's Park, which has been described as 'one of the most desirable private homes in London', which was designed as the Burton family mansion by James's son Decimus, and built by his own company. The Holme was the second villa in Regent's Park, and the first of those to be either designed or constructed by the Burton family. The hallmark of the Burton design is the large semi-circular bay that divided the principal elevation and that had two storeys. The original villa also had a conservatory of polygonal form, which used wrought iron glazing bars, then only recently patented, instead of the then customary wooden bars. The first villa to be constructed in the park was St. John's Lodge by John Raffield.

The Burton family had residences and offices at 10, 12, and 14 Spring Gardens, St. James's Park, that were at the east end of The Mall, where Decimus Burton constructed Nos. 10, and 12, and 14 Spring Gardens. The Burton family also had offices at Old Broad-Street in the City of London, and at Lincoln's Inn Fields (at which Septimus Burton was a solicitor at Lincoln's Inn and trained William Warwick Burton.

Personal life
Burton was Master of the Worshipful Company of Tylers and Bricklayers in 1801 to 1802. In 1804, in response to the cessation of amicable relations with the French Republic, Burton recruited 1600 volunteers, whom he named the Loyal British Artificers, at his expense, from the artificers that were in his employ, and of which he became Lieutenant-Colonel Commandant, for the eventuality of invasion by the French. The rally-point of Burton's Loyal British Artificers was to be the Tottenham Court Road. Burton attended the funeral of Horatio Nelson in 1806.

James Burton was an early member of the Athenaeum Club, London, as was his son, Decimus Burton, who has been described as the 'prime member of the Athenaeum' by architectural scholar Guy Williams who there 'mixed with many of the greatest in the land, meeting the most creative as well as those with enormous hereditary wealth'. During 1820, Burton, his wife, and his children dined and attended the opera with George Bellas Greenough to finalise Greenhough and Decimus's designs.  James and Decimus Burton were 'on excellent terms' with Princess Victoria, and with the Duchess of Kent. The Princess and the Duchess, with several courtiers, laid the foundation stone of a Decimus Burton School in Tunbridge Wells, and, five weeks later, in autumn 1834, they stayed, by Decimus's invitation, at James Burton's villa at St Leonards-on-Sea, for several months, until several weeks into 1835.

Elizabeth Burton died at St Leonards-on-Sea on 14 January 1837. James Burton died at St Leonards-On-Sea on 31 March 1837. James is buried in a pyramidal tomb in the churchyard of St Leonards-on-Sea, the town that he had designed and created, where a commemorative monument was erected.

Marriage and children
On 1 March 1783, at St. Clement Danes, Strand, London, James Burton married Elizabeth Westley (12 December 1761 – 14 January 1837), of Loughton, Essex, daughter of John and Mary Westley. They had six sons and six daughters, ten of whom were alive at the time of their father's death on 31 March 1837. Their first four children were all baptized at the church at which they had married, and entered in the church registers with the surname 'Haliburton': however, James and Elizabeth changed their surname to 'Burton' between the birth of their fourth child and the birth of their fifth child.
 William Ford (11 January 1784 – 18 October 1856). William Ford was named after his maternal granduncle, William Ford. He was prevented from attending university by a severe injury caused by a fall from his horse in 1806. He began farming with his father in 1807. The office of the Burton family in the City of London, was that from which William Ford managed the Powder Mills, Leigh, Medway - which were initially known as the Ramhurst Powder Mills, and later as the Tunbridge Gunpowder Works – that he established in 1811 in partnership with his father and with Sir Humphry Davy, both of whom were early members of the Athenaeum Club, London. Subsequent to the retirement of James Burton in 1824, William Ford became the sole owner of the mills until his death in 1856, at which point the gunpowder business was transferred to his brother, Alfred Burton JP, who was Mayor of Hastings. William Ford lived at St John's Wood, The Holme, and South Lodge, St. Leonards-on-Sea. He never married but had two illegitimate sons: Henry Marley Burton FRIBA (1821 - 1880) and William Warwick Burton (d. 21 October 1861). Henry Marley was baptized as Henry Marley on 12 Dec 1821: at his baptism, he was claimed to be the son of William Marley and Sally Marley, London neighbours of the Burtons. Henry Marley had at least one son, Edgar Burton, also an architect, whose daughter Adelaide was abortively married to Leopold Albu, of 4 Hamilton Place, Mayfair, the brother of Sir George Albu, between 19 August 1901 and 1915. William Warwick Burton lived at Lincoln's Inn Fields, where he was articled as a solicitor to his uncle, Septimus Burton (1794 - 1842) of Lincoln's Inn. William Warwick Burton had three children, William Edgar Burton, Edmund Burton, and Jessy Burton, each of whom were left property in the will of their uncle, Decimus, who never married and died without issue.
 Emma Elizabeth (4 August 1785 – 13 December 1785). She died from smallpox.
 Eliza (29 September 1786 – 6 February 1877). She lived for a time at No. 36 Marina and later at No. 5 West Hill in St. Leonards-on-Sea. She did not marry.
 James  (22 September 1788 – 22 February 1862). Egyptologist.
 Emily (10 August 1791 – 20 May 1792).
 Jane (4 April 1792 – 11 December 1879). She married Thomas Walker (who changed his surname to Wood in 1817) of Tonbridge, at Tonbridge, in 1812. She had one son George James (1813–1831), and three daughters, Emily (1815–1892), Helen (1816–1903), and Rose Anne (b. 1818) who lived at North Lodge St. Leonards-on-Sea.
 Septimus (27 July 1794 – 25 November 1842). Septimus was educated at Lincoln's Inn, where he in 1810 was articled to J. W. Lyon and founded his legal practice, which managed his father's business. Septimus in 1824 married Charlotte Lydia Elizabeth Middleton, by whom he had one son, Arthur (b. 1830), who in 1860 married Lilian Margaret Robertson. Septimus lived at Serle Street, Lincoln's Inn Fields. He is buried at Chiswick.
 Octavia (b. 20 May 1796 - d. after March 1837) She married the banker Edmund Hopkinson, at Tonbridge in 1813, by whom she had no issue.
Henry FRCP (27 February 1799 – 10 August 1849). Physician who discovered the Burton line. He in 1826 married Mary Elizabeth Poulton (1800 - 1829) at St. George's, Bloomsbury.
 Decimus FRS FRSA RA FSA FRIB  (30 September 1800 – 14 December 1881).  Architect. 
 Alfred (18 June 1802 – 24 April 1877) JP, Mayor of Hastings, and manager of the Burton estates. He trained in architecture and worked as the secretary of Decimus Burton and to Thomas Wood (who was the husband of Jane Burton). In St. Leonards-on-Sea, Alfred Burton was Steward of the Races; President of the Mechanics Institute; Vice-President of the Infirmary; and Trustee of Hastings and Flimwell Turnpike. He was a member of the Queen's Royal St. Leonards Archers, and of the Oriental Club, to which he donated books and pictures, and to which his brother Decimus and nephew Henry Marley Burton made architectural additions. Alfred married Anna Delicia Adams in 1843. They had one son, Alfred Henry (1845–1917) of Hastings Lodge, JP who was High Sheriff of Sussex in 1902, who married Ellen Amelia Dickson, by whom he had four children, and one daughter Louisa Charlotte (1849–1873), who did not marry.
 Jessy (12 April 1804 – after 24 April 1844) Jessy, who lived in Regent's Park, married in 1833 John Peter Fearon (1804–1873), who was a lawyer of Great George Street, Westminster. She had 3 daughters: Jessy Tyndale (1834–1910); Constance Mary (1835–1915); and Ethel Anna (1839–1901) (who married and had issue with Thomas Ayscough); and one son, Francis (1837–1914) (who married Julia Mary Woodward, and had issue). Jessy's middle daughter, Constance Mary Fearon, was the founder of the Francis Bacon Society and author (under the pseudonym Mrs Henry Pott) of books that advocated that Francis Bacon, 1st Viscount St. Alban was the author of the works that were ascribed to William Shakespeare.

References

Further reading

1762 births
1837 deaths
19th-century English businesspeople
19th-century English architects
Real estate and property developers
Neoclassical architecture in London
Regency architecture